The 1936 World Table Tennis Championships – Corbillon Cup (women's team) was the third edition of the women's team championship. 

Czechoslovakia won the gold medal with a perfect 9–0 round robin match record. Germany and the United States tied for the silver medal with a 7–2 record. No bronze medal was awarded.

Final table

See also
List of World Table Tennis Championships medalists

References

-
1936 in women's table tennis